In the Alley is an album by saxophonist Willis Jackson which was recorded in 1976 and first released on the Muse label.

Reception 

In his review on Allmusic, Scott Yanow calls the album a "typical but often exciting outing" and states "The music includes blues, romps, a ballad, and funky vamps".

Track listing 
All compositions by Willis Jackson except where noted.
 "Niamani" (Sonny Phillips) – 7:25
 "Gator's Groove" (Yusef Ali) – 7:07
 "Blues Blues Blues" – 5:09
 "Young Man With a Horn" (Ray Anthony) – 5:58
 "More" (Nino Oliviero, Riz Ortolani, Marcello Ciorciolini, Norman Newell) – 7:45
 "In the Alley" – 9:14

Personnel 
Willis Jackson – tenor saxophone
Sonny Phillips – piano
Carl Wilson – organ
Jimmy Ponder – guitar
Jimmy Lewis – bass
Yusef Ali – drums
Buddy Caldwell – congas, percussion

References 

Willis Jackson (saxophonist) albums
1977 albums
Muse Records albums